He Who Said No may refer to:

 Der Neinsager: A Plays by Bertolt Brecht. 
 He Who Said No (film), a 2014 Iranian film